The Ireland national ice hockey team is the national men's ice hockey team of the Republic of Ireland run by the Irish Ice Hockey Association (IIHA) and a member of the International Ice Hockey Federation (IIHF) since 26 September 1996.

The Republic of Ireland gained promotion to Division II of the IIHF World Championships in 2007, but after a worst performance in their Division II debut, they were then relegated back to Division III. The team is unable to participate in any IIHF World Championship tournaments since placing 4th with 6 points in 2013. With the closure of the Dundalk Ice Dome, they no longer meet their minimum participation standards. In 2017, the team returned at international competition after a four-year absence, and played at the inaugural Development Cup in Canillo, Andorra. They finished as the runners-up after falling 11–4 to Morocco.

The team has had members from both Northern Ireland and the Republic of Ireland and has a working relationship with the Belfast Giants of the Elite Ice Hockey League (EIHL) and new Irish clubs, Flyers Ice Hockey Club and Dundalk Bulls.

History
The Republic of Ireland was accepted into the IIHF in May 1996 after a nomination by Great Britain and a second by Canada. They have not had a long history of international competition, with the Irish national team first competing in 2004.

Early in 2007, Team Ireland moved their headquarters to the Dundalk Ice Dome. It was envisaged that the Ice Dome would become a center of excellence for ice hockey in the Republic of Ireland, and it was here that Team Ireland took silver in the IIHF World Championship Division III and gained promotion to Division II. The next year they were relegated after a last place finish in Division II, but in 2010, they earned a first-place result and again earned promotion to Division II. The next year the took last place in the Division II Group B World Championships and were relegated to Division III which they played in. In 2012 and 2013, earning fourth place in the World Championship each year. They have not competed at a world championship since.

IIHF World Ranking
As of 30 May 2022, Ireland is currently not ranked in the IIHF World Ranking.

International competition

2004 IIHF World Championship Division III; Reykjavík, Iceland
Game 1. Ireland 3 – Mexico 8 
Game 2. Armenia 1 – Ireland 15
Game 3. Ireland 1 – Iceland 7
Game 4. Turkey 7 – Ireland 4
Final result: fourth place, one win, and three losses for 2 points, 23 goals for, 23 goals against

2005 IIHF World Championship Division III; Mexico City, Mexico
Game 1. Ireland 23 – Armenia 1
Game 2. Luxembourg 8 – Ireland 4
Game 3. Ireland 4 – South Africa 5
Game 4. Mexico 6 – Ireland 1
Final result: fourth place, one win, and three losses for 2 points, 32 goals for, 20 goals against

2006 IIHF World Championship Division III; Reykjavík, Iceland
Game 1. Ireland 0 – Armenia 6
Game 2. Iceland 8 – Ireland 0
Game 3. Turkey 2 – Ireland 2
Game 4. Ireland 3 – Luxembourg 1
Final result: fourth place, one win, two losses, and one tie for 3 points, 5 goals for, 17 goals against

2007 IIHF World Championship Division III; Dundalk, Ireland
Game 1. Ireland 11 – Mongolia 0
Game 2. Ireland 2 – New Zealand 4
Game 3. Ireland 3 – South Africa 1
Game 4. Ireland 4 – Luxembourg 3 (OT)
Final result: second place, two wins, one overtime win, and one loss for 8 points, 20 goals for, 8 goals against [Team Ireland is Promoted to Division II of the 2008 IIHF World Championships]

2008 IIHF World Championship Division II Group B; Miercurea Ciuc, Romania
Game 1. Ireland 1 – Serbia 13
Game 2. Ireland 4 – Bulgaria 7
Game 3. Ireland 1 – Belgium 9
Game 4. Ireland 1 – Romania 21
Game 5. Ireland 1 – Israel 7
Final result: last place, five losses for 0 points, 8 goals for, 57 goals against [Team Ireland is relegated to the 2009 IIHF World Championship Div III]

2009 IIHF World Championship Division III; Dunedin, New Zealand
Game 1. Ireland 3 – Greece 7
Game 2. Ireland 3 – Luxembourg 8
Game 3. Ireland 5 – Mongolia 0 (Forfeit)
Game 4. Ireland 1 – Turkey 7
Game 5. Ireland 0 – New Zealand 9
Final result: fifth place, one win, and four losses for 3 points, 12 goals for, 31 goals against

2010 IIHF World Championship Division III Group A; Kockelscheuer, Luxembourg
Game 1. Ireland 6 – Luxembourg 4
Game 2. Greece 1 – Ireland 3
Game 3. United Arab Emirates – 2 Ireland 8
Final result: first place, three wins for 9 points, 17 goals for, 7 goals against [Team Ireland is Promoted to Division II of the 2011 IIHF World Championships]

2011 IIHF World Championship Division II Group B; Zagreb, Croatia
Game 1. Ireland 0 – Bulgaria 6
Game 2. China 5 – Ireland 0
Game 3. Romania 22 – Ireland 0
Game 4. Ireland 4 – Croatia 21
Game 5. Iceland 14 – Ireland 0
Final result: last place, five losses for 0 points, 4 goals for, 68 goals against [Team Ireland is relegated to the 2012 IIHF World Championship Div III]

2012 IIHF World Championship Division III; Erzurum, Turkey
Game 1. Luxembourg 7 – Ireland 2
Game 2. Ireland 5 – Greece 3
Game 3. Ireland 3 – Turkey 5
Game 4. Ireland 8 – Mongolia 4
Game 5. North Korea 5 – Ireland 0
Final result: fourth place, two wins, three losses for 6 points, 18 goals for, 24 goals against

2013 IIHF World Championship Division III; Cape Town, South Africa
Game 1. Greece 3 – Ireland 6
Game 2. South Africa 7 – Ireland 4
Game 3. Luxembourg 5 – Ireland 0
Game 4. Ireland 1 – North Korea 2
Game 5. Ireland 7 – United Arab Emirates 3
Final result: fourth place, two wins, three losses for 6 points, 18 goals for, 20 goals against

2017 Development Cup; Canillo, Andorra
Game 1. Morocco 10 – Ireland 2
Game 2. Ireland 9 – Portugal 4
Game 3. Ireland 5 – Andorra 3
Final. Morocco 11 – Ireland 4
Final result: runners-up, two wins, two losses for 6 points, 20 goals for, 28 goals against

2018 Development Cup; Füssen, Germany
Game 1. Macedonia 9 – Ireland 6
Game 2. Portugal 12 – Ireland 4
Game 3. Ireland 6 – Andorra 4
Semifinal. Portugal 10 – Ireland 1
Bronze medal game. Ireland 8 – Andorra 7
Final result: third place, two wins, three losses for 6 points, 25 goals for, 42 goals against

2022 Development Cup; Füssen, Germany
Game 1. Liechtenstein 7 – Ireland 6
Game 2. Ireland 7 – Algeria 6
Game 3. Ireland 6 – Andorra 6
Game 4. Ireland 3 – Colombia 3
Game 5. Portugal 4 – Ireland 12
Final result: third place, two wins, one loss, and two ties for 6 points, 34 goals for, 26 goals against

Personnel
 Nigel Smeaton – Head Coach

Team

2013 Roster
(roster taken from the IIHF. IIHF Tournament Page)

Head coach:  Kenneth Redmond

All-time record against other nations
Last match: 1 October 2017

References

External links
Official website
IIHF profile

 
 
National ice hockey teams in Europe